Volk's Electric Railway (VER) is a narrow gauge heritage railway that runs along a length of the seafront of the English seaside resort of Brighton. It was built by Magnus Volk, the first section being completed in August 1883, and is the oldest operational electric railway in the world, though it was not the first electric railway to be built. It was preceded by electrification of Miller's line in 1875, Werner von Siemens' 1879 demonstration line in Berlin and by the Gross-Lichterfelde Tramway of 1881, although none of these remain in operation.

Operated as an historical seafront tourist attraction, the railway does not usually run during the winter months, and its service is also liable to occasional suspension due to severe weather or maintenance issues.

History

Volk family
Electrical power at 50 V DC was supplied to the small car using the two running rails. The electrical supply was increased to 160 V DC and the power plant was installed in the arch built into the cliff face at Paston Place. In 1886 an off-set third rail was added to minimise current leakage.

In 1896, the unusual Brighton and Rottingdean Seashore Electric Railway was built by Volk. Due to problems concerning the construction of lengthened groynes to the east of Paston Place this closed in 1901, although it was not finally dismantled until 1910. Following the closure Volk's original electric railway was extended from Paston Place (today's Halfway) to Black Rock on 21 February 1901. Paston Place was also the home of Volk's Seaplane Station, which was used by Volk's son George Herbert Volk. In 1930, the line was cut back  from Palace Pier to its present terminus, still known as Aquarium. In 1937, a new Black Rock station was opened at the end of the shortened line.

Brighton Corporation

In April 1940, Brighton Corporation took control of the line. On 2 July 1940, World War II defensive preparations resulted in the line closing. After the war, starting in 1947, the corporation rebuilt the line using  rail for the running line and  mounted on insulators for the third rail. At Black Rock, a new station was built to replace the 1937 building which had suffered badly during the war. The line reopened for passengers in 1948.

Winter operation ceased from 1954, although the line did reopen temporarily in the winter of 1980 to cash in on the large numbers of sightseers who had come to look at the Athina B, a freighter that had beached near the Palace Pier. Two-car multiple operation was introduced in 1964. In recent years, there has been a decline in visitor numbers due to package holidays abroad. In 1995, the Volk's Electric Railway Association was formed to help the operator of the line (Brighton & Hove City Council) promote and operate the line. In 2003, the Volks Railway Institute of Science and Technology was formed to promote the educational and science side of the Victorian railway to schools and special interest groups.

In the late 1990s, the Black Rock end of the line was shortened by 211 feet to permit a storm water storage scheme to be built in the marina area. The 1948 station was demolished and replaced by a new single platform station, which opened in 1998 and shares a building with a new Southern Water pumping station.

Lottery funding
In 2014, it was announced that the railway had been awarded a grant of £1.6 million by the Heritage Lottery Fund, a sum which had to be spent by March 2017. The work funded included: the provision of a new visitor centre and ticket office at the Aquarium station; a new five-road depot (4 stock roads and one through running line) with engineering facilities, inspection pit, and public viewing gallery at Halfway; the restoration of cars 4, 6, and 10 from a semi-derelict state to full working order; and the provision of new educational materials about the railway.

Route

Overview
Today the line runs between terminal stations at Aquarium (a short distance from the Palace Pier) and Black Rock (at Black Rock, not far from Brighton Marina), with an intermediate station and depot at Halfway.

There are no branch lines, although there was originally a branch at Paston Place (now Halfway), with a line running across Madeira Drive and into the railway's workshops, which were located (with Magnus Volk's office) inside the cliff on the landward side of the road.

Stations
Palace Pier was the original terminus of 1883 in the centre of Brighton. Named Aquarium at the original opening, it was renamed Palace Pier in 1899 when the pier of that name was opened to the public. The station was closed in 1930 when the western end of the railway was shortened to allow the widening of Madeira Drive.

Aquarium station opened in 1930, as the new western terminus of the line following its shortening. As the new station was closer to the old Brighton Aquarium than the Palace Pier, the new station revived the old Aquarium name. It remains the western terminus. Originally provided with two platforms, one was closed in the 1960s, and the tracks were later taken up, leaving today's station as single-platform. The station was completely rebuilt in 2016-2017 and now has toilets, a cafeteria, staff rooms, a ticket office, and an exhibition centre.

Halfway station is located in the middle of the railway, and has previously been known as Paston Place, Children's Playground, and Peter Pan's Playground. The original station opened in 1884 when the line was extended, and was both the eastern terminus and the depot. Volk also built his own offices at this location, inland from the station. The original station was located on the same site as the depot, and remained there until the station remodelling just after the second world war, when the new station platforms and passenger shelters were constructed about 50 yards further west than the original site. The station has two platform faces, on a single central island platform, in the centre of a passing loop. There is a public viewing gallery in the neighbouring railway depot and workshop.

Black Rock station opened in 1901 when the railway was extended eastwards. The original station, with two platforms, a ticket office, and a waiting room, was situated in an isolated location. Subsequently, a Corporation swimming pool gave further purpose to the location, and today it is close to the thriving Brighton Marina. The original station was replaced in 1911 with a much larger bungalow-style building. This was in turn closed and demolished in the winter of 1936-1937 when the line was shortened to allow for the construction of the Black Rock swimming pool. The new Black Rock station opened in May 1937, still with two platforms. The station building was again rebuilt in 1948 in Art Deco style, still with two platforms, although from the mid-1960s the south platform was abandoned. In the 1980s the second (south) platform was restored and used for special school visits trains, operating around the timetabled service. This was short-lived, and in 1989 the south platform track was lifted. The station was briefly renamed Marina Station in the early 1990s, but was in turn demolished in the mid-1990s during a storm drain project, with a new Regency style station building opened in 1998. This new station, which reverted to the original Black Rock name, was provided with only one platform (plus ticket office and toilets), and remains in current use.

No other stations are in current use, although there have been halts associated with intermediate passing loops. Former intermediate passing loop halts have been known as Sussex Square (or Lift), and Kemp Town. There was also a temporary Black Rock station constructed, with platform and booking office, during the storm drain project of the mid-1990s.

Signalling
The line is single throughout, with three passing loops - one at Halfway station (previously known as Paston Place and Peter Pan's Playground), and two others roughly midway between each terminal station and Halfway. The passing loops are equipped with spring loaded turnouts. These are set so that trains entering a loop are routed to the left track. Trains can exit the loop by pushing the switch blade to the appropriate position. In normal service two trains operate from end to end, passing at Halfway station, and there is generally only one train on each single track section at any one time. This is sufficient to provide a 15-minute interval service. Drivers are now equipped with radios which allow communication between themselves, stations, and control.

Nevertheless, the line is operated using single track tokens. There are four colour coded tokens, one each for the sections between Aquarium and the first passing loop (red token), the passing loop and Halfway (yellow token), Halfway to the next passing loop (blue token), and the passing loop to Black Rock (white token). In practice, the two pairs of tokens (for the two sections west of Halfway, and for the two sections east of Halfway) are permanently combined into a single dual token, marked with two colours, as full operation of the line as four block sections is very rare. Due to the low line speed, multiple trains are able to operate in each section, but the token must be carried on the train furthest from Halfway.

There are warning lights at pedestrian crossing points to the beach with a warbling siren to warn of the approach of a train. A following train is required to signal its approach to a pedestrian crossing point by sounding its klaxon horn. One such crossing provides the only external access to Halfway station.

Rolling Stock
The numbering of cars can cause some confusion as numbers were duplicated when new cars replaced scrapped vehicles. In 1948, cars Nos. 8, 9 and 10 were renumbered 5, 2 and 1 respectively after the cars bearing those numbers were scrapped. All cars reverted to their original numbers in the year 2000. The cars were often built in pairs. Currently, there are seven electric cars and one diesel locomotive in operation on the line with an additional two electric cars on static display elsewhere.

The railway also has a few service wagons that are used with the diesel locomotive.

A highly detailed model of Volks carriage No. 6 is on show in the foyer of the Brighton Toy and Model Museum, donated by Siemens who provided much of the electrical equipment used on the railway.

Volk's Electric Railway Association (VERA)
At the invitation of the Council and the management of the railway, a supporters association, 'The Volk's Electric Railway Association' was formed in 1995. Members of the Association provide practical and promotional help to the railway, including operation and maintenance tasks. The Association also attends various exhibitions with a large operating model of the railway as it was in the 1950s. Membership is open to all with an interest in the railway. Members receive a quarterly magazine, reduced rate travel on the railway and free admission to a series of winter meetings held in Brighton. The Association also acts as a collector for Volk's memorabilia and ephemera, some of which can be seen at the South Downs Heritage Centre in Hassocks. The largest object now in the care of the Association is the ex Southend Car which, between 1950 and 2000, carried the Volk's fleet number 9. Car 3 will become a two-year joint restoration project if the temporary restoration shed gains consent during spring 2014.

References

Bibliography

External links

Volk's Electric Railway website
Volks Railway information at Brighton & Hove City Council website
Volk's Electric Railway Association
Volks Railway Institute of Science and Technology
Southern e-group photos
  illustrated description of the railway
Map sources for:

Heritage railways in East Sussex
Transport in Brighton and Hove
Tourist attractions in Brighton and Hove
2 ft gauge railways in England
2 ft 8½ in gauge railways in England
Railway lines opened in 1883
1883 establishments in England